Maynila (lit. Manila) is a weekly anthology of inspiring stories. The series aired on GMA Network's every Saturday. The show is hosted by Lito Atienza.

Episode list

Unknown

2004

2005

2006

2007

2008

2009

2010

2011

2012

2013

2014

2015

2016

2017

2018

2019

2020

References

Lists of anthology television series episodes
Lists of Philippine drama television series episodes